Marten Yorgantz (born 24 June 1946 in Istanbul) is a popular French-Armenian singer and composer. He is recognized as a popular Armenian singer in Europe.

He recorded 24 albums in different languages, mostly in Armenian, Italian and French. Among his well-known hits are "Chkuytik", "Hayi Achker", "Hayeren Ergenk", "Ayp, Pen, Kim", "Ay Maral Maral", "Partir pour ne plus revenir" and others. In 1976, he opened his first restaurant called Cappadocia in the Armenian populated Alfortville district outside of Paris. In 1980 he opened a second restaurant in the rue Saint-Georges in the heart of Paris, where he regularly sings, but which has now been closed.

After the Spitak earthquake he gave about 100 concerts for the Armenian children.

Awards
Golden micro, France, 1967
Gold medal of Karot festival, Moscow, 2008

Discography
Studio Albums:
1976 Sings... Armenian Immortal
1978 Volume 2
1979 Volume 3
1980 Yorgantz
1982 Yorgantz
1984 Yorgantz
1985 Yorgantz
1986 International
1987 Hye Es Toun, Hayeren Khoseh
1989 Yorgantz For Children
1990 Ser Yev Mioutioun
1992 International
1993 Yorgantz Sings For Children
1997 L'Armenian
2000 Yorgantz 2000
2006 Sepastia

References

External links
The Official Yorgantz site

20th-century Armenian male singers
20th-century French male singers
Turkish people of Armenian descent
Living people
1946 births
Singers from Istanbul
Turkish emigrants to France
People from Alfortville